Amahata Dam is an arch dam located in Yamanashi Prefecture in Japan. The dam is used for power production. The catchment area of the dam is 99.7 km2. The dam impounds about 59  ha of land when full and can store 11000 thousand cubic meters of water. The construction of the dam was completed in 1967.

References

Dams in Yamanashi Prefecture
1967 establishments in Japan